Bruce Weyhrauch is an attorney in Juneau, Alaska, United States. He is also a  former representative in the Alaska State House representing Juneau's District 4. Weyhrauch has practiced at his own law office in Juneau for nearly three decades. His regulatory and government affairs-focused practice handles a wide variety of matters, including labor relations and natural resources.

Education and career
After receiving his BS in natural resource planning and engineering from Humboldt State University, Weyhrauch matriculated at the Northwestern School of Law of Lewis and Clark College, where he served as the editor-in-chief of Environmental Law. His publications during this period include "Operation Exodus: The United States Government’s Program to Intercept Illegal Export of High Technology" (Computer Law Journal, 1986).

Maintaining an active presence in his community, he has served as an officer or director on the Board of Directors of the Foundation For End of Life Care, Inc.; Chapel-by-the-Lake, Inc.; Rotary International, Juneau Shooting Sports Foundation, Inc.; Juneau Economic Development Council; Big Brothers/Big Sisters Board of Directors; and the AWARE Women's Shelter. Weyhrauch has held positions with the Juneau Port Authority, the Juneau Economic Development Council, and the City and Borough of Juneau Board of Equalization. An Eagle Scout, Weyhrauch has served in numerous capacities and on the Boy Scouts of America's Southeast Alaska Council Executive Board.

Indictment, conviction and Supreme Court case reversal

In May 2007, Weyhrauch, along with fellow Republican state House members Pete Kott and Vic Kohring, were charged in connection with a scandal involving oilfield service company VECO attempting to buy government favors in Alaska. The ensuing investigation led to the widely publicized indictment, trial and convictions of United States Senator Ted Stevens in October 2008, and the indictments and convictions of former representatives Tom Anderson and Beverly Masek and state Senator John Cowdery, as well as VECO chairman Bill Allen and vice president Richard Smith. Alaska businessmen/lobbyists Bill Weimar (former for-profit halfway house owner), Bill Bobrick, and Jim Clark, chief of staff for former governor Frank Murkowski, also were indicted and convicted. Clark's guilty plea and sentence were later vacated before he was ordered to report to custody.

Weyrauch had been charged with bribery, extortion, conspiracy and mail fraud. After being found guilty in a trial, on October 15, 2007, he was sentenced to five years in prison. He appealed, and subsequently his proceedings were granted an indefinite stay while issues involved were re-examined by the U.S. Supreme Court. This was followed by Weyhrauch prevailing at the Supreme Court on a challenge to the honest services fraud statute. His case was decided on June 24, 2010, in association with the similar Skilling v. United States and Conrad Black case decisions.

Weyhrauch's federal case was remanded to the 9th Circuit Court of Appeal, and as a result of this re-examination, all federal charges were dismissed. He pleaded guilty to a misdemeanor lobbying violation, was given a suspended sentence and probation, and was fined $1,000. It was estimated he had spent $300,000 on his defense.

Personal
Weyhrauch was stranded on Coghlan Island in the Juneau area on April 22, 2007, after he fell out of his boat at about 6:00 PM that night; he was forced to swim to the island.  The United States Coast Guard District Seventeen, Sector Juneau, searched for Weyhrauch during the night.  A volunteer rescue team from the nonprofit organization SEADOGS found him alive at approximately 11:00 AM on April 23.

References

External links
 Bruce Weyhrauch at 100 Years of Alaska's Legislature

1953 births
Alaska lawyers
Living people
Republican Party members of the Alaska House of Representatives
Politicians from Juneau, Alaska
Politicians from Lincoln, Nebraska
Alaska politicians convicted of crimes
21st-century American politicians